Weronika Szmajdzińska (born 26 April 1994) is a Polish beauty pageant titleholder who was crowned Miss Polonia 2015 and represented Poland in Miss Universe 2015 pageant. She also represented Poland at the Miss World 2012 pageant, where she was the first runner-up for the Top Model prize, but did not place in the actual pageant.

Personal life
Szmajdzińska was born in 1994 and raised in the city of Szczecin.

Pageantry

Miss World 2012
Szmajdzińska was appointed Miss Polski 2012 after being Miss Polski Nastolatek 2011 (Miss Poland Teen 2011). She then competed at the Miss World 2012 pageant in Ordos City, China. She was the first runner-up for the Top Model award and also a finalist for the Beach Fashion and Interview awards, but did not place in the actual pageant.

Miss Polonia 2015
On 30 October 2015, Szmajdzińska was announced to be Miss Polonia 2015.

Miss Universe 2015
As Miss Polonia 2015, Szmajdzińska competed at the Miss Universe 2015 pageant but Unplaced.

General references

References 

Living people
1994 births
Polish beauty pageant winners
Models from Szczecin
Miss Universe 2015 contestants
Miss World 2012 delegates